Lester Raymond Brown (March 14, 1912 – January 4, 2001) was an American jazz musician who led the big band Les Brown and His Band of Renown for nearly seven decades from 1938 to 2000.

Biography
Brown was born in Reinerton, Pennsylvania. He enrolled in the Conway Military Band School (later part of Ithaca College) in 1926, studying with famous bandleader Patrick Conway for three years before receiving a music scholarship to the New York Military Academy, where he graduated in 1932. Brown attended college at Duke University from 1932 to 1936. There he led the group Les Brown and His Blue Devils, who performed regularly on Duke's campus and up and down the east coast. Brown took the band on an extensive summer tour in 1936. At the end of the tour, while some of the band members returned to Duke to continue their education, others stayed on with Brown and continued to tour, becoming in 1938 the Band of Renown. The band's original drummer, Don Kramer, became the acting manager and helped define their future.  

In 1942, Brown and his band concluded work on an RKO picture, Sweet and Hot; played at the Palladium Ballroom, Hollywood. A few years later, in 1945, this band brought Doris Day into prominence with their recording of "Sentimental Journey". The song's release coincided with the end of World War II in Europe and became an unofficial homecoming theme for many veterans. The band had nine other number-one hit songs, including "I've Got My Love to Keep Me Warm".

In 1952–53, Brown was the orchestra leader on Day's radio program, The Doris Day Show, on CBS. 

Les Brown and the Band of Renown performed with Bob Hope on radio, stage and television for almost fifty years. They did 18 USO Tours for American troops around the world, and entertained over three million people. Before the Super Bowls were televised, the Bob Hope Christmas Specials were the highest-rated programs in television history. Tony Bennett was "discovered" by Bob Hope and did his first public performance with Brown and the Band.

The first film that Brown and the band appeared in was Seven Days' Leave (1942) starring Victor Mature and Lucille Ball. Rock-A-Billy Baby, a low-budget 1957 film, was the Band of Renown's second, and in 1963 they appeared in the Jerry Lewis' comedy The Nutty Professor playing their theme song "Leapfrog".

Brown and the Band were also the house band for The Steve Allen Show (1959–1961) and the Dean Martin Show (1965–1972). Brown and the band performed with virtually every major performer of their time, including Frank Sinatra, Ella Fitzgerald and Nat King Cole. The annual Les Brown Big Band Festival, started March 2006 in Les' hometown, features area big bands preserving the songs of the big band era. At the 2012 festival celebrating the 100th birthday anniversary, the town of Reinerton renamed the street near Les' birthplace to Les Brown Lane. In 2013 his hometown of Reinerton, PA adopted as the town's official slogan: Reinerton: The Town of Renown in honor of Les and his band.

Les Brown Sr. died of lung cancer in 2001, and was interred in the Westwood Village Memorial Park Cemetery in Los Angeles, California. He was survived by his wife Evelyn, son Les Jr., and daughter Denise. He was 88 years old at the time of his death.

His grandson, Jeff "Swampy" Marsh, co-created the show Phineas and Ferb and Milo Murphy's Law.

Brown was inducted into the North Carolina Music Hall of Fame in 2010.

Les Brown Jr.
In 2001, Les Brown Jr. (1940–2023), became the full-time leader of the Band of Renown. It continues to perform throughout the world and have a regular big band show in Branson, Missouri. Brown Jr. also hosted a national radio show on the Music of Your Life network. Brown Jr. was a television actor in the 1960s (Gunsmoke, General Hospital, The Baileys of Balboa, Gilligan's Island), a rock musician and producer who worked with Carlos Santana, and a concert promoter for many country music artists including Merle Haggard and Loretta Lynn. In 2004, Brown Jr. received the "Ambassador of Patriotism" award from the POW Network. Brown Jr. died from cancer at his home in Branson, Missouri, on January 9, 2023, at the age of 82.

Discography
 Connee Boswell I Don't Know (1950)
 Connee Boswell Martha (1950)
 Over the Rainbow (1951)
 Palladium Concert 1953 (Group 7, 2005)
 Live at the Hollywood Palladium (1954)
 Dancer's Choice (Capitol, 1956)
 Les Brown & His Orchestra, Vol. 2 (Hindsight, 1949)
 Radio Days Live (early radio recordings, 2001)
 Les Brown & His Band of Renown (Coral, 1957)
 Swing Song Book (Coral, 1957)
 Concert Modern (Capitol, 1958)
 Live at Elitch Gardens 1959 (1959)
 The Les Brown Story: His Greatest Hits in Today's Sound (Capitol, 1959)
 The Lerner and Loewe Bandbook (Columbia, 1961)
 Play Hits From The Sound of Music, My Fair Lady, Camelot, and Others (Columbia, 1963)
 Stereophonic Suite for Two Bands: The Les Brown Band and Vic Schoen and His Orchestra (Kapp, 1959)
 A Sign of the Times (Decca, 1966)
 Today (MPS, 1976)
 Goes Direct to Disc (The Great American Gramophone Company, 1977)
 Digital Swing (Fantasy, 1986)
 Anything Goes (USA, 1994)
 America Swings (Hindsight, 1995)
 Bandland / Revolution in Sound (Collectables, 1995)
 Sentimental Thing with Bing Crosby & Billy Eckstine (Sounds of Yesteryear, 2003)
 The Les Brown All-Stars (Group 7, 2006)
 No Name Bop
 A Good Man Is Hard to Find
 Thank You for Your Fine Attention
 The One and Only (Intersound / Memorylane, 2016)

Musical short films
 Spreadin' the Jam (1945) dir: Charles Walters
  Les Brown (1948) (10 min) dir: Jack Scholl
  Les Brown and His Band of Renown (1949) (15 min) dir: Will Cowan
  Art Lund-Tex Beneke-Les Brown  (1948) (10 min) dir: Jack Scholl
  Connee Boswell and Les Brown's Orchestra (1950) (15 min) dir: Will Cowan
  Crazy Frolic (1953) (19 min) dir: Will Cowan
 Dance Demons (1957) (14 min) dir: Will Cowan
 Rockabilly Baby (1957) (81 min) dir: William F.Claxton

Television
 Bob Hope Show  (1945) NBC Radio
 Bob Hope Show (1959–1966) NBC
 The Steve Allen Show (1958–1960) NBC
 The New Steve Allen Show (1961) NBC
 Hennesey (1962) CBS
 Hollywood Palace (1964) NBC
 Bob Hope Thanksgiving Show (1964) NBC
 Dean Martin Show (1965) NBC
 Dean Martin Summer Show (1966) NBC
 Rowan and Martin at the Movies (1968) NBC
 Rowan & Martin's Laugh-In (1968) NBC
 Dean Martin and the Golddigger's (1968) NBC
 The Christmas Songs (Mel Torme, host)(1972) PBS
 Bob Hope Special: Joys (1976) NBC
 The Good Old Days of Radio (1976) NBC
 Doris Day's Best Friends (1985) NBC
 Ooh-La-La, It's Bob Hope's Fun Birthday Special from Paris (1981) NBC
 Biography: Doris Day "It's Magic" (1985)
 Rocko’s Modern Life

References

External links

 Les Brown Historical Marker and Photographs
 Les Brown Scores Collection Rubenstein Rare Book and Manuscript Library, Duke University
 With Bob Hope Show Christmas Day 1968 Vietnam
 Connee Boswell and Les Brown (1950) Short Film (15 min.)
 New York Military Academy archives page - Alumni of Distinction
 Les Brown Interview NAMM Oral History Library (1994)
 Les Brown recordings at the Discography of American Historical Recordings
 
  Entry for Les Brown Jr.
 
  Entry for Les Brown Jr.

1912 births
2001 deaths
20th-century American musicians
American bandleaders
Big band bandleaders
Burials at Westwood Village Memorial Park Cemetery
Deaths from lung cancer in California
Duke University alumni
Hep Records artists
Liberty Records artists
New York Military Academy alumni
People from Schuylkill County, Pennsylvania
United Service Organizations entertainers
Bluebird Records artists
Okeh Records artists
Columbia Records artists
Coral Records artists